De Haven may refer to:

De Haven, Virginia
De Haven Glacier, Wilkes Land, Antarctica
USS De Haven (DD-469), a Fletcher-class destroyer
USS De Haven (DD-727), a destroyer

See also
DeHaven (surname)